is a Japanese professional tennis player.

During her career, she has won one singles title on the ITF Circuit, and achieved a career-high singles ranking of 280. In doubles, she has won six titles on the WTA Tour, one title on the WTA Challenger circuit as well as 21 ITF titles, and peaked at No. 20 in the WTA rankings on 22 October 2018.

Ninomiya began playing tennis on ITF events in 2009.

Playing for Japan Fed Cup team, she has a win–loss record of 5–1.

Performance timeline

''Only main-draw results in WTA Tour, Grand Slam tournaments, Fed Cup/Billie Jean King Cup and Olympic Games are included in win–loss records and career statistics.

Doubles

Grand Slam tournament finals

Doubles: 1 (runner-up)

WTA career finals

Doubles: 14 (6 titles, 8 runner-ups)

WTA Challenger finals

Doubles: 1 (1 title)

ITF Circuit finals

Singles: 3 (1 title, 2 runner–ups)

Doubles: 33 (21 titles, 12 runner–ups)

Notes

References

External links
 
 
 

1994 births
Living people
Japanese female tennis players
Tennis players at the 2018 Asian Games
Medalists at the 2018 Asian Games
Asian Games medalists in tennis
Asian Games bronze medalists for Japan
Olympic tennis players of Japan
Tennis players at the 2020 Summer Olympics
21st-century Japanese women